74th Regiment or 74th Infantry Regiment may refer to:

 74th Infantry Regiment (Poland), a unit of the Polish Army
 74th Regiment of Foot (disambiguation), several units of the British Army
 74th (Essex Fortress) Anti-Aircraft Battalion, Royal Engineers, British air defence unit
 74th Infantry Regiment (United States), former infantry unit of the US Army

American Civil War:
 74th Illinois Volunteer Infantry Regiment, a unit of the Union (Northern) Army 
 74th Indiana Infantry Regiment, a unit of the Union (Northern) Army 
 74th New York Volunteer Infantry Regiment, a unit of the Union (Northern) Army 
 74th Ohio Infantry, a unit of the Union (Northern) Army 
 74th Pennsylvania Infantry, a unit of the Union (Northern) Army

See also
 74th Division (disambiguation)
 74 Squadron